Athletics competitions at the 1963 South Pacific Games were held at the Buckhurst Park in Suva, Fiji, between 30 August and 2 September 1963.

A total of 29 events were contested, 19 by men and 10 by women.

Medal summary
Medal winners and their results were published on the Athletics Weekly webpage
courtesy of Tony Isaacs and Børre Lilloe, and on the Oceania Athletics Association webpage by Bob Snow.

Men

Women

Medal table (unofficial)

Participation (unofficial)
At least 9 of 13 participating countries were present at the athletics events.

 Cook Islands

References

External links
Pacific Games Council
Oceania Athletics Association

Athletics at the Pacific Games
International athletics competitions hosted by Fiji
South Pacific Games
1963 in Fijian sport
1963 Pacific Games